was a part of the Japanese family of painters, the Kanō school. He was the middle son of school's head Kanō Eitoku, younger brother to the Kano school heir Kanō Mitsunobu, older brother to Kanō Takanobu, and adopted brother to the famed Kanō school painter Kanō Sanraku. Naizen primarily worked with his fathers and brothers in the head Kanō workshop in Kyoto to restore many imperial buildings, Buddhist temples, and Shinto shrines that were destroyed during the Kamakura period and the Genpei Wars. In 1610–15 Naizen moved to Edo (modern-day Tokyo), the new administration capital, at the behest of the recently ascendent Tokugawa shogunate, Tokugawa Ieyasu.

Stylistically Nazien is often overshadowed by his father and brothers; however he is particularly known for his byōbu screen paintings  of Nanban ("Southern Barbarians", i.e. Europeans).  Naizen acquired his name when officially entering the Kanō school; his personal name was Shigesato.

One of his more famous works, "Festivals of Toyokuni", was one of these such paintings, produced in 1605 for the seventh anniversary of the death of Kampaku Toyotomi Hideyoshi, whose posthumous name was Toyokuni Daimyōjin.

References
 Nussbaum, Louis Frédéric and Käthe Roth. (2005). Japan Encyclopedia. Cambridge: Harvard University Press. ; OCLC 48943301
 Lane, Richard. (1978).  Images from the Floating World, The Japanese Print. Oxford: Oxford University Press. ;  OCLC 5246796

Specific

External links

 Namban Byōbu (Barbarians from the South) Kanō Naizen, Kobe City Museum
Bridge of dreams: the Mary Griggs Burke collection of Japanese art, a catalog from The Metropolitan Museum of Art Libraries (fully available online as PDF), which contains material on this artist (see index)

1570 births
1616 deaths
16th-century Japanese people
17th-century Japanese people
16th-century Japanese artists
17th-century Japanese artists
16th-century Japanese painters
17th-century Japanese painters
Kanō school